David Phillip Wiffill (born 19 April 1961) is an English former professional football player and coach.

Career
Wiffill played as a midfielder in England and Hong Kong for Frome Town, Bath City, Manchester City, Happy Valley, Gloucester City, Bristol Rovers, Stroud and Thornbury Town. At Bristol Rovers, Wiffill made two appearances in the Football League during the 1987–88 season. At Gloucester City, he made a total of 8 appearances in the 1986–87 season.

He later became a football manager and was in charge of Thornbury Town for three years before resigning in June 2004.

References

1961 births
Living people
English footballers
English expatriate footballers
English football managers
Frome Town F.C. players
Bath City F.C. players
Manchester City F.C. players
Happy Valley AA players
Gloucester City A.F.C. players
Bristol Rovers F.C. players
Forest Green Rovers F.C. players
English Football League players
Expatriate footballers in Hong Kong
Association football midfielders
English expatriate sportspeople in Hong Kong